The Big Streets (Greek: Megaloi dromoi) is a 1953 Greek drama film directed by Grigoris Grigoriou and starring Dinos Dimopoulos, Liana Liapi and Giannis Argyris. It was neorealist in style. Its failure at the box office led Grigoriou to turn to making more potentially commercial films.

Cast
 Dinos Dimopoulos as Nikos Gerasimou  
 Liana Liapi as Margarita  
 Giannis Argyris as Thomas Gerasimou  
 Giorgos Vlahopoulos 
 Veatriki Deligianni 
 Giorgos Dimou 
 Popi Deligianni 
 Stavros Xenidis 
 Kostas Strantzalis 
 Nana Papadopoulou 
 Eirini Koumarianou 
 Nana Viopoulou 
 Takis Mandilas 
 Kostas Kontonis 
 Georgios Mitropoulos 
 Zoi Rouhota 
 Hristos Katzigiannis 
 Lina Dadi 
 L. Simonetos  
 Haroula Antahopoulou
 Marika Ninou
 Vasilis Tsitsanis as Singer

References

Bibliography
 Vrasidas Karalis. A History of Greek Cinema. A&C Black, 2012.

External links
 

1953 films
1953 drama films
1950s Greek-language films
Greek drama films
Films directed by Grigoris Grigoriou
Greek black-and-white films